The Mövenpick BDMS Wellness Resort Bangkok is a luxury wellness hotel on Witthayu Road, Bangkok, Thailand.

BDMS is an abbreviation of Bangkok Dusit Medical Services.

History
The hotel was built by Thai developer Lursakdi Sampatisiri in 1984 as the Hilton International Bangkok at Nai Lert Park, managed by Hilton International. On June 13, 2003 the Sampatisiri family signed Raffles International Hotels to manage the hotel in their Swissôtel division, and on January 1, 2004 it was renamed first Nai Lert Park Bangkok, a Raffles International Hotel and then later Swissôtel Nai Lert Park Bangkok. It contained 338 rooms. Lonely Planet said of the hotel, "a mishmash of bygone styles, the Nai Lert is a bit disappointing in the cramped rooms, but glorious underneath a shady tree in its private garden-park." The hotel was awarded Thailand’s Leading Business Hotel by the World Travel Awards Asia in 2008. The hotel restaurant Ma Maison was named Best Restaurant by Thailand Tatler’s Best Restaurants. On June 4, 2009, American actor David Carradine was found dead of asphyxiation in the wardrobe of his room in the hotel.

The hotel was sold to Bangkok Dusit Medical Services in 2016 and closed on December 31, 2016 for conversion to a branch of Bangkok Hospital. However it was announced in August 2018 that BDMS would partner with Mövenpick Hotels & Resorts and they reopened the property as a "holistic services medical centre" resort hotel in 2019, the Mövenpick BDMS Wellness Resort Bangkok .

Gallery

References

External links
Mövenpick BDMS Wellness Resort Bangkok official site

Hotels in Bangkok
Hotels established in 1984
Hotel buildings completed in 1984
1984 establishments in Thailand
Pathum Wan district